Manuel Horacio Díaz Luco (born 27 July 1943), known as Horacio Díaz Luco, is a Chilean former professional footballer who played as a centre-back for clubs in Chile, Costa Rica and El Salvador.

Career
Born in Talcahuano, Chile, Díaz played for Santiago Wanderers in 1970.

Then he moved to Costa Rica, where he played for Herediano, Limón Sprite, Cartaginés, Municipal Turrialba and Municipal Limón, with whom he was the runner-up in the 1981 season. At the same time he was player of Limón Sprite, he performed as coach.

He also had a stint in El Salvador with Águila from 1975 to 1977, with whom he won the league title in 1975–76.

Honours
Águila
 Salvadoran Primera División (2): , 1976–77

References

External links
 Horacio Díaz at PlaymakerStats.com
 Horacio Díaz at MemoriaWanderers.cl 

1943 births
Living people
People from Talcahuano
Chilean footballers
Chilean expatriate footballers
Santiago Wanderers footballers
C.S. Herediano footballers
C.D. Águila footballers
C.S. Cartaginés players
A.D. Turrialba players
Limón F.C. players
Chilean Primera División players
Salvadoran Primera División players
Liga FPD players
Chilean expatriate sportspeople in El Salvador
Chilean expatriate sportspeople in Costa Rica
Expatriate footballers in El Salvador
Expatriate footballers in Costa Rica
Association football defenders
Chilean football managers
Chilean expatriate football managers
Expatriate football managers in Costa Rica